Only Trust Your Heart is a studio album by American singer Dionne Warwick. It was released by MPCA Records and RED Music on March 15, 2011. A specialty album that is devoted to the work of lyricist Sammy Cahn, it reached the top ten of the US Billboard Top Jazz Albums.

Critical reception

Allmusic editor William Ruhlmann found that Warwick gives "Cahn's better-known works [...]  a variety of musical settings, starting with the bossa nova arrangement of the title song and going on to small jazz bands, big string orchestras, solo piano accompaniments, and even a blues reading ("Keep Me in Mind"). She ignores previous interpretations, making each song her own [...] If she never really put both feet into any one genre of music, that has turned out to serve her well on a late album like this, on which she demonstrates a mastery of several classic pop styles, just as Cahn was able to switch gears as a lyricist-for-hire throughout his distinguished (if often unheralded) career."

Track listing 
All tracks produced by Michael Mangini.

Charts

Release history

References 

Dionne Warwick albums
2011 albums